Alkaline Trio is an American punk rock band from Chicago, Illinois. Since 2001, the band has consisted of Matt Skiba (vocals, guitar), Dan Andriano (vocals, bass) and Derek Grant (drums, vocals).

Founded in late 1996 by Skiba, bassist Rob Doran, and drummer Glenn Porter, Alkaline Trio released its debut single, "Sundials", in 1997. Following its release, Doran departed from the band and was replaced by Andriano. The band subsequently recorded an EP, For Your Lungs Only (1998), and its debut studio album, Goddamnit (1998). Following the release of the band's second album, Maybe I'll Catch Fire (2000), Porter left the band and was replaced by Mike Felumlee for its subsequent album, From Here to Infirmary (2001).

Backed by the singles "Stupid Kid" and "Private Eye", From Here to Infirmary significantly increased the band's exposure, and its follow-up, Good Mourning (2003), charted highly on the Billboard 200. Good Mourning marked the recording debut of current drummer Derek Grant. In 2005, the band released Crimson which expanded upon the band's punk rock influences, with prominent overdubs and additional instrumentation, and continued with this direction on Agony & Irony (2008), which was released on Epic Records.

In 2010, the band released This Addiction on its own label Heart & Skull and Epitaph. Recorded in the band's home town of Chicago, with early producer Matt Allison, the album was a conscious effort by the band to return to their punk rock roots; it became the highest-charting album of their career, debuting on the Billboard 200 at No. 11. In 2011, the band celebrated its 15-year anniversary with the release of Damnesia, which featured new, acoustic-based recordings of songs from across the band's career. The band's eighth studio album, My Shame Is True, was released on April 2, 2013.

Their ninth album, Is This Thing Cursed? was released on August 31, 2018, followed by a three track EP titled E.P. which was released on March 19, 2020.

History

Early years, Goddamnit and Maybe I'll Catch Fire (1996–2000)
Alkaline Trio was formed in December 1996, originally consisting of Matt Skiba (guitar/lead vocals), Rob Doran (bass/vocals), and Glenn Porter (drums/vocals). 1997 saw the release of the band's first EP, Sundials. This was followed shortly after by the departure of Rob Doran, after which Dan Andriano, former singer of Asian Man Records band Tuesday and bassist for Slapstick, took his place and they began recording. The band released their second EP entitled For Your Lungs Only, in 1998. Later that year, the band released their first full-length album, Goddamnit, followed by Maybe I'll Catch Fire in 2000, both on Asian Man Records). In 1999, the band released the I Lied My Face Off EP on Asian Man Records and filmed their first music video, directed by Link 80 guitarist Matt Bettinelli-Olpin. Also in 2000, the band released a collection of their previously released EPs on their self-titled album.

From Here to Infirmary and Good Mourning (2001–2004) 
In 2001, the band released From Here To Infirmary on Vagrant Records. This album inspired music videos for the singles "Stupid Kid" and "Private Eye." The album was the band's first album to reach above Billboard top 200 mark and the first to gross six figures in sales.

Their next full-length album was Good Mourning, released in 2003, with the album's launch single "We've Had Enough" seeing much the same success as the previous single "Stupid Kid". The album was something of a departure from earlier works, featuring greater production values.

The band appeared on various compilation albums, notably Plea for Peace Vol. 1, Vagrant Records: Another Year on the Streets Vol. 1, 2, and 3, and Rock Against Bush Vol. 1. Matt Skiba and Dan Andriano have both independently recorded split records, Skiba with Kevin Seconds on Asian Man Records and Andriano with Mike Felumlee on Double Zero Records, as well as jointly performing backing vocal duties on the album This is Unity Music by Common Rider. They recorded two split EPs: one with Hot Water Music in 2002 and the other with One Man Army in 2004.

In 2004, Andriano became a member of The Falcon, a group consisting of The Lawrence Arms' bassist Brendan Kelly, previously of Slapstick (alongside Andriano) and The Broadways, and drummer Neil Hennessy. The Falcon also saw contributions from Todd Mohney of The Killing Tree and formerly Rise Against. The band released an EP, God Don't Make No Trash / Up Your Ass With Broken Glass in 2005 and its first full-length, Unicornography in September 2006.

Crimson and Agony & Irony (2005–2008) 
Alkaline Trio released their fifth studio album on Vagrant Records, titled Crimson, on May 24, 2005, which featured the single "Time to Waste." The single for this song also included bonus tracks produced by Squirtgun and Common Rider bassist Mass Giorgini. The tracks "Mercy Me" and "Burn" have also been released as singles from the album.

In December 2005, a dual-disc special edition re-release of Crimson hit store shelves. This album features the original cut of Crimson released earlier in the year, while the 2nd disc has demo and acoustic/live versions of some of the songs. Additionally, an enhanced version of the lyrics and liner notes are available for download with personal messages from the band members on the history and/or inspiration(s) behind the songs.

In September 2006, Patent Pending, the debut album by Matt Skiba's side project Heavens was released. The band consisted of Skiba on guitar and vocals, and Josiah Steinbrick (of hardcore punk outfit F-Minus) on bass. On the album, the duo were joined by The Mars Volta's Isaiah "Ikey" Owens on organ and Matthew Compton on drums and percussion. Skiba was playing with Heavens during a short tour in the fall of 2006.

In October 2006, it was announced that Alkaline Trio had signed with V2 Records. On January 12, 2007, the North America branch of the label announced that they were undergoing restructuring to focus on their back catalogue and digital distribution. As a result, their employees were let go and their roster of artists left as free agents.

January 30, 2007 marked the release of Remains an album of B-sides, rarities and live performances. An accompanying DVD contained performances from The Occult Roots Tour and all the band's music videos to date. This marked the end of their association with Vagrant Records.

During late May 2007 the band began listing Epic Records as its label on their MySpace.

This Addiction (2009–2011)
During a concert in May 2009, the band revealed that they were no longer signed to Epic Records and that they would be releasing new material through their own label later in the year. Recording began that July. Four songs from the album ("This Addiction", "Dead On The Floor", "Dine, Dine My Darling", and "Dorothy") were debuted on that tour with Saves the Day.

On November 18, 2009, the band announced that they would be releasing their new album on their own newly formed label, Heart & Skull, a joint venture with Epitaph Records. In the same article, Skiba also confirmed that the new album would be released on February 23, 2010, with another new song announced, entitled "The American Scream." The trio went back to their home in Chicago to record This Addiction after recording their last few albums in L.A. The band worked hard to go back to their roots with the album, Atlas Studios being the place they recorded their first three albums.

On December 1, Alkaline Trio confirmed to Rock Sound that the title of their new album would be This Addiction: "It is the first song on the record and the title of our new album," said vocalist Matt Skiba. "The song takes heroin addiction as a metaphor for love. The whole record is really personal, all three of us have been through quite a bit since our last album [2008's Agony & Irony] and it is all expressed through this, all the songs are about the relationships we've been in and so the record has a constant theme." The album debuted at No. 11 on the Billboard 200, making it the highest the band has ever charted to date.

Alkaline Trio released an LP, Damnesia, on July 12, 2011. Consisting of "a selection of beloved fan favorites selected from the group's extensive catalogue and presented in an intimate semi-unplugged format", the LP also included two new songs, "Olde English 800" and "I Remember a Rooftop", as well as a cover version of the Violent Femmes' "I Held Her in My Arms". The band went on a fifteenth-anniversary United States tour in support of the album.

My Shame Is True and "Past Live" tour (2012–2015)
On July 14, 2012, in an interview with The Punk Site, it was confirmed by Dan Andriano that the band would begin recording their next studio album that October. "We're going to go work with Bill [Stevenson] at Fort Collins at the Blasting Room. Bill and Jason [Livermore]. We've all wanted to work with Bill for a long time and this is kind of the time to do it. So we're going to go hang out there in October. Make a new record."
On October 27, 2012, Skiba confirmed that the band had completed the album.
On February 1, 2013, the band released a lyric video for the album's lead single, "I Wanna Be A Warhol". On February 5, the band released the artwork and track-listing for the album, titled My Shame Is True, as well as the artwork and track-listing for an EP called Broken Wing. Both My Shame Is True and Broken Wing were released on April 2, 2013. The album peaked at #24 on the Billboard charts The band toured to support the album during 2013.

In 2014, the band conducted an anthology tour dubbed the "Past Live" tour, in which they performed all eight studio albums in their entirety over four consecutive shows in several cities.

Is This Thing Cursed? and supporting tour (2016–2019)
In an interview on July 20, 2015, Dan Andriano was quoted saying, "We need to make a new record, pretty much. We're gonna go to England and play some shows with NOFX, do a couple festivals this fall, but it's time for us to make a new record. But I'm doing some Emergency Room stuff and I'm not sure what Matt's gonna be up to with the Sekrets, if he's gonna tour on that, but I think by early next year we're gonna be recording another record."

While the production of the ninth album was postponed by Matt Skiba's work with Blink-182, in an interview on July 3, 2016, Skiba assured that the album would move forward, saying, "I'll be writing for a new Alkaline Trio record while on this summer tour so once things with Blink cool down a bit, the Trio can go in and make a new record and start touring again while Blink is on break. [...] It's such a unique and wonderful position to be in, having two full time bands that people – myself included – are big fans of."

Alkaline Trio opened for the Misfits on December 28 and 30, 2017. On January 11, 2018, the band announced that the Chicago stop during their 2014/15 Past Live Tour (all eight studio albums performed in four nights) will be released in its entirety on Blu-ray, and as an eight-LP box set. Past Live will be released in February 2018. In addition to this announcement, the band also hinted at new music coming soon. Andriano stated that "There's not an inch of me that feels like we're done making music, or we're done making new stuff. I wanna be a band that people want to hear new stuff from. Because I feel like I'm still in a band that wants to write good, new music."

Alkaline Trio was slated to perform at the Self Help Festival on March 3, 2018. However, they were forced to back out after Skiba went through throat surgery. The band shared on Instagram: "Matt's recovery from throat surgery is not healing as quickly as planned and, per his doctor, he can't perform. Everything went well, he just needs more time to heal so he can play many shows in the future. Thank you for understanding."

On July 19, 2018, Alkaline Trio announced their ninth studio album, Is This Thing Cursed?, along with the release of the lead single, "Blackbird." The band also went on a North American tour to support the album with opening act, Together Pangea. On August 2, 2018, it was announced on Skiba's Instagram that Grant would not be drumming on the tour due to ongoing health problems. Skiba and Andriano recruited former My Chemical Romance touring drummer, Jarrod Alexander, to fill in for Grant on the tour, which began the next day in Dallas, Texas and ended on October 18 in Santa Cruz, California, while the album was released on August 31.

E.P. and upcoming tenth album (2020-present)
On January 30, 2020, the band posted a picture of Andriano in a recording studio with the subtitle "New Jams!" (as well as some pictures with Skiba and Andriano in vocal booths) on Instagram, indicating that work on new material was on its way.

On March 19, 2020, the band released a three-song EP entitled E.P. after postponing a planned tour with Bad Religion due to the COVID-19 pandemic, with the songs being recorded before the pandemic. Skiba announced in Instagram comments in April 2020 that he is currently writing more music for the band. In June 2021, the tour with Bad Religion was rescheduled with the first show taking place in Riverside, California on October 15, 2021.

In March 2022, the band went on a UK co-headlining tour with Taking Back Sunday. During an interview on the tour, Grant discussed their plans for new music, stating that new songs had mostly been played at soundchecks, but that "things are starting to kind of take shape, and I think we're at the stage now where we're ready to start actually kind of committing to tape somehow, even if it's just on an iPhone at you know, soundchecks." Grant also discussed plans for a 20th anniversary celebration for Good Mourning, explaining that he had some ideas for what they may want to do, such as shows or a rerelease of the album.

Music style, influences, lyrics, related bands, and similar bands

Music style, influences, and lyrics
Alkaline Trio has been described as pop punk, punk rock, emo, emo pop, hardcore punk, and goth punk. Alkaline Trio's influences include Social Distortion, Naked Raygun, Screeching Weasel, Pegboy, Ramones, Misfits, Green Day, The Clash, Jawbreaker, Buzzcocks, Sex Pistols, Joy Division, Bauhaus, The Cure, Ministry, NOFX, Front 242, and The Sisters of Mercy. Alkaline Trio's lyrical themes have included alcoholism, women, love, and depression. Dan Ozzi of Differuser wrote that Alkaline Trio's "lyrics combine the macabre imagery of the Misfits with the clever turns of phrases of Jawbreaker."

Related bands and similar bands
Alkaline Trio is part of a very large circle of Chicago punk/hardcore bands. Skiba was previously a member of Jerkwater, Blunt, and Traitors. Former drummer Glenn Porter played in 88 Fingers Louie. Andriano's previous bands were Slapstick and Tuesday. Mike Felumlee (drums) has also performed with Duvall and Smoking Popes, whilst current Alkaline Trio drummer, Derek Grant, who joined the band after the From Here to Infirmary album, has also played for Laughing Glass, Skolars, Telegraph, The Suicide Machines, Thoughts of Ionesco, Dan Zanes, The Sugar Pup and Sean Madigan Hoen. In 2004 Dan Andriano joined the newly assembled group, The Falcon, with Andriano performing with fellow former Slapstick member Brendan Kelly (guitar and vocals), Neil Hennessy (drums), and Todd Mohney, a former member of Rise Against. Mohney played guitar on the first EP but did not appear in the band's debut album Unicornography, and his spot was filled in by Kelly and Hennessy.

Alkaline Trio have been compared to bands such as Jawbreaker and Green Day.

In 2006 Skiba started the side-project Heavens with Josiah Steinbrick, previously of F-Minus. Their debut album, Patent Pending was released on Epitaph Records.

On September 16, 2009, bassist and co-vocalist Dan Andriano announced he would be playing a series of solo shows across the US under the name "Dan Andriano In The Emergency Room". The band announced on Twitter that Andriano will be releasing his debut solo album under the same name in summer 2011. The album, Hurricane Season, was released on August 9, 2011, under the moniker 'Dan Andriano in the Emergency Room'. A second album followed in 2015 named Party Adjacent.

Skiba was set to release his debut solo album on February 14, 2010, but it was delayed until the summer of 2010 due to the new Alkaline Trio album. The album's name is Demos. In May 2012 Skiba released his second solo album (featuring his backing band, The Sekrets) entitled Babylon. In June 2015 Skiba released his third solo album with The Sekrets entitled "KUTS".

From 2015 to 2022, Skiba performed and recorded with rock band Blink-182. He began performing with the group starting with three shows in March 2015 filling in for long-time guitarist/vocalist Tom DeLonge who departed the group for the second time earlier that year. Skiba eventually became an official member and recorded two full-length albums with the band, before DeLonge rejoined.

Band members

Current members
 Matt Skiba – guitar, lead and backing vocals, bass (1996–present)
 Dan Andriano – bass, lead and backing vocals, guitar (1997–present)
 Derek Grant – drums, backing and occasional lead vocals, acoustic guitar (2001–present)

Former members
 Rob Doran – bass, backing vocals (1996–1997)
 Glenn Porter – drums (1996–2000)
 Mike Felumlee – drums (2000–2001)

Touring substitutes
 Pete Parada – drums (2001)
 Atom Willard – drums (2001)
 Jarrod Alexander – drums (2018-2019)

Studio substitutes
 Tony Barsotti - drums (2020)

Timeline

Discography

Studio albums
Goddamnit (1998)
Maybe I'll Catch Fire (2000)
From Here to Infirmary (2001)
Good Mourning (2003)
Crimson (2005)
Agony & Irony (2008)
This Addiction (2010)
My Shame Is True (2013)
Is This Thing Cursed? (2018)

References

External links

 

 
Musical groups established in 1996
American musical trios
Emo musical groups from Illinois
Pop punk groups from Illinois
Punk rock groups from Illinois
1996 establishments in Illinois
Epic Records artists
V2 Records artists
Epitaph Records artists
Asian Man Records artists
Jade Tree (record label) artists
Vagrant Records artists
People from McHenry, Illinois
Musical groups from Chicago
Musical trios